Matei Ghica (1728 – 8 February 1756), a member of the Ghica family, was the Prince of Wallachia between 11 September 1752 and 22 June 1753, and Prince of Moldavia between 22 June 1753 and 8 February 1756. He was son of Grigore II Ghica and brother of Scarlat Ghica.

References

Matei
Rulers of Moldavia
Rulers of Wallachia
1756 deaths
Rulers of Moldavia and Wallachia
1728 births